Bani Bayadhah Mosque is one of the historic mosques in Medina, Saudi Arabia, and it is believed to be the place where the Islamic prophet Muhammad stopped by for prayer, according to the accounts of Umar bin Shabba and Ibn Zabala.

See also

 List of mosques in Saudi Arabia
  Lists of mosques  
 List of mosques in Medina

Mosques in Medina